Liberty Manifesto is the debut studio album by the Canadian hard rock band Airtime, a collaboration between guitarist Rik Emmett and Von Groove percussionist Mike Shotton, which was released in 2007.

Track listing
 "Edge of Your Mind" - 4:24
 "Midnight Black & Blue" - 3:39
 "Liberty" - 6:17
 "Headstream" - 1:55
 "River Runs Deep" - 4:22
 "Find Your Way" - 4:46
 "Addicted" - 4:21
 "Code 9" - 5:08
 "Rise" - 4:39
 "Moving Day" - 4:02
 "Transmutation" - 5:27

Two bonus tracks were issued for non-North American releases: "Cryin' Shame" (Escape Music, ESM162) and "Tomorrow's Promise" (Avalon, MICP-10703)

Personnel
 Rik Emmett - Guitars, Vocals, Bass, Synthesizers
 Michael Shotton - Percussion, Drums, Backing Vocals, Noise
 Don Breithaupt - Keyboards

Production
 Rik Emmett - Producer, Engineer
 Michael Shotton - Engineer, Mixing, Producer
 Rick Andersen - Mixing
 Nick Blagona - Mastering
 Jim Bullotta - Art Direction, Design
 Darko - Photography

External links
 Liberty Manifesto Entry at the Official Rik Emmett Homepage

Rik Emmett albums
2002 albums
Rockit Sounds albums